Xenon nitrate, also called xenon dinitrate, is an inorganic compound consisting of one xenon atom bonded to two nitrate groups. It can be made by reacting xenon difluoride with anhydrous nitric acid, but it only exists transiently before decomposing, and therefore it has not been isolated and full characterized. A related compound, xenon fluoride nitrate, has been made and is stable enough to be studied in more detail.

Production
Attempted production has used the following reaction:

XeF2 + 2 HNO3 → Xe(NO3)2 + 2 HF

This reaction makes a red-brown solid. However, it decomposes spontaneously at 23 °C, turning blue temporarily while doing so:

Xe(NO3)2 → Xe + O2NOONO2 (an unstable nitrogen peroxide)

References

Xenon(II) compounds
Nitrates